Alexandre Raposo de Matos (born 31 May 1995) is a Macanese international footballer. He also holds Portuguese citizenship. He is currently contracted with Portuguese amateurs Canas de Senhorim.

Club career
Having started his career at his father's side, Windsor Arch Ka 1, Matos spent a season with Lam Ieng before moving to Sporting Clube de Macau. In 2014, he was offered a trial with the Macanese club's parent affiliate, Sporting Clube de Portugal. He returned to Windsor Arch for the 2015 season, before heading to England to study sports psychology while also playing for lower division side Greenwood Meadows.

On 30 December 2021, he was announced as a new signing of Eccellenza Sicily amateur club Mazara. In August 2022, he returned in Portugal to join amateur club Canas de Senhorim.

International career
Matos made his senior international debut for Macau in qualification for the 2018 FIFA World Cup, playing 90 minutes in a 3–0 defeat to Cambodia.

Personal life
Matos is the son of Angolan-born former footballer Paulo Conde, and the two featured in the same league game for Windsor Arch Ka I in 2012; a 1–0 win over Lam Pak. However they were not on the pitch at the same time, as Conde had been substituted at half time, and Matos came on in the 87th minute.

Career statistics

Club

Notes

International

References

External links
 
 

1995 births
Living people
Portuguese footballers
Portuguese expatriate footballers
Portuguese sportspeople of Angolan descent
Macau footballers
Macau people of Angolan descent
Macau people of Portuguese descent
Macau international footballers
Association football defenders
Windsor Arch Ka I players
Lam Ieng players
Sporting Clube de Macau players
Greenwood Meadows F.C. players
East Midlands Counties Football League players
Portuguese expatriate sportspeople in England
Expatriate footballers in England